June Elizabeth Appleby (born 2 June 1941) was an Australian politician who represented the South Australian House of Assembly seats of Brighton from 1982 to 1985 and Hayward from 1985 to 1989 for the Labor Party. She was the Bannon government whip from 1985 to 1989.

References

 

Members of the South Australian House of Assembly
1941 births
Living people
Australian Labor Party members of the Parliament of South Australia
Women members of the South Australian House of Assembly